Riverdale High School is a public high school operated by the Rutherford County School system located in the southwestern part of Murfreesboro, Tennessee. It is on Warrior Drive which intersects with South Church Street (US 231 South). Riverdale is one of the older high schools in Murfreesboro, along with Oakland High School which was also built in 1972. These schools were constructed to replace the outdated former Murfreesboro Central High School, which was then converted to a junior high school (later middle school) facility. It is home to 12 academic departments, 40 extracurricular clubs, and 19 TSSAA athletic teams.

Academics
In 2014, Riverdale High School ranked better than 21.3% of high schools in Tennessee. It also ranked second among high schools in the large Rutherford County School District.

Campus
Along with Oakland High School (Tennessee), the sprawling campus includes two main academic buildings containing computer labs, science labs, an auditorium, a band room, two cafeterias, and many classrooms. The freshmen have a dedicated building known as the Annex. The fieldhouse features a full-size basketball court, a wrestling room, workout areas, locker rooms, and coaching offices. The spacious site also has softball, baseball, soccer, and football fields, and a swimming pool.

Band program
Established in 1972, the Riverdale High School Band has a long tradition of success.

Choir
Students can choose General Music, Music Theory, or one of Riverdale's Choirs to earn their Fine Arts Credit. The Women's Chorale and Men's Ensemble just require love and desire to sing, while the more advanced Riverdale Singers require an audition with high-performance expectations.

Key Club
Key Club is a club for students interested in making a difference in the community through volunteer service. It is open to all interested students.
Every year at Riverdale High School, club members carry out two service projects a month. Some of our their popular service projects are:
 Holding two blood drives for the American Red Cross of Middle Tennessee. Key Club members recruit donors during lunches and volunteer to help out on the day of the drive.
 Collecting donations for homeless Rutherford County students through the ATLAS program. Key Club members encourage students to bring in needed supplies and then they collect, tally, and donate them.
 Creating the "Soup for Souls dinner event" to raise money for local homeless shelters. Key Club members sell tickets, make soup, decorate tables, and then serve soup during the fundraising dinner. RHS art students donate their created ceramic soup bowls, and ticket-holders get to keep them.
 Organizing canned food drives for Second Harvest Food Bank and Greenhouse Ministries.
 Creating holiday cards for wounded veterans and birthday parties for the children of fallen soldiers.
 Taking care of animals at PAWS
 Fundraising through Trick or Treat for UNICEF's Eliminate Program, to eliminate the deadly Neonatal and Maternal Tetanus disease
 Fundraising for the Change 4 Tay foundation.

National Art Honors Society
NAHS is a nationally recognized program designed to support and encourage students who demonstrate interest and skills in the visual arts. NAHS provides opportunities for scholarships and national recognition with 48,000 art students worldwide. Students at Riverdale that are active members are working on building character while performing community and school-wide service.
Projects include:
 Rutherford County Quilt Trail
 Volunteer Face Painting for Discovery Center and John Coleman fall festival
 Painting and creating for teachers who need visual props
 Murals for beautification of Riverdale

School newspaper and yearbook
The Smoke Signal is Riverdale High School's online newspaper. Six staff members provide the writing, photography, and website updates necessary to keep the newspaper up to date. These writers are part of a larger creative writing class but are dedicated to journalistic writing only and their focus is the Smoke Signal. During the fall homecoming festival, the newspaper offers a photo booth as a fundraising event to help keep cameras and software updated.

The Riverdale High School yearbook, Lance & Shield, is a 360-page history book published every year by a staff of students who work both in and out of class to create the book. Students provide much of the candid photography used in the book and write all of the copy and captions. To help offset the price of yearbooks, members of the staff solicit local businesses for ads and offer senior congratulatory ads to parents. The staff organizes and runs both the fall and spring photo days, as well as the club picture day in October.

Notable alumni

Fernando Bryant (1977–), NFL cornerback
Dennis Harrison (1956–), NFL Defensive End
Carson Tinker (1989–), NFL long snapper

References

External links
 

 Public high schools in Tennessee
 Schools in Rutherford County, Tennessee
 Buildings and structures in Murfreesboro, Tennessee
1972 establishments in Tennessee
 Educational institutions established in 1972